Stefan Jarosław Hula Jr. (born 29 September 1986) is a Polish ski jumper, four-time Olympian (2006, 2010, 2018 and 2022), a bronze medalist of the 2018 Olympic Games in team.

Personal life
Stefan Hula Jr. was born in Szczyrk, Poland. His father Stefan Hula Sr. is a former Nordic combined skier and bronze medalist at the 1974 FIS Nordic World Ski Championships in Falun. Hula Jr. has a brother, Przemysław, and two sisters, Katarzyna and Magdalena, who were trained in sledging. In May 2012, he married Marcelina. They run together the company "Huligans" in which Marcelina sews suits for ski jumpers (she sewed the suit, in which Kamil Stoch won two gold medals at Olympic Games in Sochi). Stefan and Marcelina have a daughter Milena (born 2011). In March 2017, he announced the upcoming birth of their second child. On March 23, 2017, his second daughter was born.

Career
At the 2006 Ski Flying World Championships, Hula finished ninth in the team and 37th in the individual events. His best individual World Cup finish was 6th in a large hill event in Kuopio, Finland in 2016. His best individual career finish was second twice in lesser events in 2005. In season 2017/18, he beat his best result and took 5th place in Oberstdorf.

On January 21, 2018 Hula and his teammates Stoch, Kubacki, and Żyła, won the first ever medal, a bronze, for Poland in ski flying in team competition. It was also the first medal for Hula in senior competition. On January 21, 2018 coach Horngacher officially appointed Stefan Hula to 2018 Winter Olympics. On January 27, 2018 he was chosen to team competition in Zakopane. Hula with teammates won team competition in Poland for the first time. It was also a first podium in World Cup for Hula. Next day, in individual competition Hula was leading after 1 round and overall took 4th place, which is his best individual result in World Cup.

Hula made his best at the 2018 Winter Olympics. In normal hill event, he was leading after the first jump, but he ended up in 5th place. On February 19, 2018, Hula and his teammates Maciej Kot, Dawid Kubacki and Kamil Stoch achieved the first medal in an Olympic team competition for Poland. They claimed bronze behind Norway and Germany.

Olympic Games

World Championships

Ski Flying World Championships

World Cup

Season standings

Individual starts

Team victories

References

External links

1986 births
Living people
Polish male ski jumpers
Ski jumpers at the 2006 Winter Olympics
Ski jumpers at the 2010 Winter Olympics
Ski jumpers at the 2018 Winter Olympics
Ski jumpers at the 2022 Winter Olympics
Olympic ski jumpers of Poland
People from Bielsko County
Sportspeople from Silesian Voivodeship
Olympic bronze medalists for Poland
Olympic medalists in ski jumping
Medalists at the 2018 Winter Olympics
21st-century Polish people